Cockrill is a surname. Notable people with the surname include:

Benjamin F. Cockrill Jr. (1866–1936), American farmer and politician
Mark R. Cockrill (1788–1872), American cattleman, horse breeder and planter.
Maurice Cockrill (1936–2013), British painter and poet
Sterling R. Cockrill (born 1925), American politician